Amegilla asserta is a species of bee endemic to Australia, belonging to the family Apidae subfamily Apinae. Females forage by performing buzz pollination.

Description

Distribution 
Amegilla asserta is found in eastern Australia, from Eyre Peninsula in South Australia, across temperate regions of Victoria and New South Wales, and along the east coast of Queensland. The range includes the cities of Adelaide, Melbourne, Sydney and Brisbane. A. asserta is the most common of the two species found in Melbourne, followed by A. chlorocyanea.

References

External links
 The genus Amegilla (Hymenoptera, Apidae, Anthophorini) in Australia: A revision of the subgenera Notomegilla and Zonamegill
Animal Diversity Web
 academia.edu

Apinae

Hymenoptera of Australia
Fauna of Victoria (Australia)
Insects of Australia
Insects described in 1926